The track and field competition in the 1998 Central American and Caribbean Games was held in Maracaibo, Venezuela.

Medal summary

Men's events

Women's events

Medal table

See also
1998 in athletics (track and field)

References

 
 
 

Athletics at the Central American and Caribbean Games
C
1998 Central American and Caribbean Games